Yongxiang is a town in Luochuan County, Yan'an, Shaanxi, China.

History 

In 1961, the Yongxiang People's Commune was established. In 1984, Yongxiang was changed from a people's commune to a township.

Administrative divisions 
Yongxiang administers 26 administrative villages.

Demographics 
, Yongxiang has a hukou population of 23,754.

Previously, in the 2000 Chinese census, these townships had populations of 13,257 and 8,524, respectively.

Transport 
National Highway 210 passes through the town.

References 

Township-level divisions of Shaanxi
Yan'an